Betchton is a civil parish in the unitary authority of Cheshire East and the ceremonial county of Cheshire, England.  According to the 2001 census it had a population of 620, increasing to 677 at the 2011 Census.  The parish is immediately to the east of Sandbach, and includes Betchton Heath, Malkin's Bank and Hassall Green.

The parish elects 10 councillors to the parish council.

Governance
Betchton civil parish was originally part of Sandbach Ancient Parish, and was created a separate parish from it in 1866. It also was part of Nantwich Hundred, Congleton Poor Law Union, Rural Sanitary District, and (after 1866) it formed part of Congleton Rural District until 1974, when it became part of the Borough of Congleton.

In terms of parliamentary representation, the Betchton area (including the period before the creation of the civil parish) was in the Cheshire, Southern Division constituency from 1832 to 1867; in the Cheshire South Division constituency from 1867 to 1885; in the Crewe division, from 1885 to 1948; from 1948 it was in Knutsford County Constituency, but it is currently in Congleton County Constituency.

Notable people
 Denise Coates CBE (born 1967) is an English businesswoman, founder and joint chief executive of online gambling company Bet365.

See also

Listed buildings in Betchton
Betchton Hall

Notes

Bibliography
Youngs, F. A. (1991). Guide to the Local Administrative Units of England. Volume I: Northern England. London: Royal Historical Society. .

External links

Villages in Cheshire
Civil parishes in Cheshire